Nadra Panjwani  is a Pakistani philanthropist and former caretaker Provincial Minister of Sindh who served in 2007–08 caretaker ministry.

Early life and career
She was born to a business family of Gujarati descent. She is a recipient of the Sitara-i-Imtiaz, the third highest civilian award in Pakistan. In 2004, Pakistani President Pervez Musharraf conferred Pakistan's second highest civilian award Hilal-i-Imtiaz to Panjwani for her services in public service.

She is a sponsor of the Zainab Panjwani Memorial Hospital, Panjwani School/College for the Blind and the Dr. Panjwani Centre for Molecular Medicine and Drug Research  at the University of Karachi in memory of her father, Dr. Mohammad Hussain Panjwani. She also supports Sindh Madressatul Islam University.

References

Living people
Pakistani philanthropists
Pakistani people of Gujarati descent
Provincial ministers of Sindh
Women provincial ministers of Sindh
Recipients of Hilal-i-Imtiaz
Recipients of Sitara-i-Imtiaz
Year of birth missing (living people)